Bhabanipur is a union under Sherpur Upazila in Bogra of Rajshahi Division, Bangladesh. It is a sacred site around Karatoyatat and one of the Shakti Peethas of Indian Subcontinent. The Bhabanipur Shaktipeeth is a place of worship consecrated to the Goddess Ma Bhabani. It is a historic place of pilgrimage for the followers of Hinduism.

References

External links
 Bhabanipur Temple  Renovation, Development & Management Committee's  Website

Populated places in Rajshahi Division